Salix lindleyana, the creeping Himalayan willow, is a species of willow in the family Salicaceae, found in the Himalayas, from northeast Pakistan to Yunnan in China.

Subtaxa
The following forms are currently accepted:
Salix lindleyana f. hebecarpa Kimura
Salix lindleyana f. lindleyana

References

lindleyana
Flora of East Himalaya
Flora of Nepal
Flora of Pakistan
Flora of South-Central China
Flora of Tibet
Flora of West Himalaya
Plants described in 1851